South Dakota Highway 168 (SD 168) is a state highway in Butte County in the U.S. state of South Dakota. It runs from U.S. Route 85 (US 85) to SD 79. The highway is maintained by the South Dakota Department of Transportation (SDDOT), and is not part of the National Highway System.

Route description
SD 168 begins at an intersection with US 85 in Butte County and treks southeast through rolling plains. The route continues in this direction for approximately  before meeting its eastern terminus at an intersection with SD 79 north of Castle Rock.

SD 168 is maintained by SDDOT. In 2012, the traffic on the highway was measured in average annual daily traffic. The route had an average of 165 vehicles. The designation is not a part of the National Highway System, a system of highways important to the nation's defense, economy, and mobility.

Major intersections

References

External links

The Unofficial South Dakota Highways Page

168
Transportation in Butte County, South Dakota